Azhdahak (also spelled Ashdahak) is the Armenian name of the Avestan demon Azhi Dahaka. In Iranian mythology, he is imprisoned in Mount Damavand, but will at the end of time break out, to be ultimately defeated by Fereydun. In his History of Armenia, the 5th-century Armenian writer Movses Khorenatsi identified Azhdahak with the Median king Astyages. Astyages' name (which is the Greek transliteration of the Old Iranian *Aršti-vaiga) was similar to that of Azhdahak, and the name Māda ("Mede") was pronounced in Armenian as Mār, which means snake in Iranian languages.

See also
List of dragons in mythology and folklore
Aži Dahāka
Vishap

References

Sources
 

 

Armenian legendary creatures
Dragons
Mythological hybrids